Fred Ingels Peterson (born February 8, 1942) is an American former Major League Baseball (MLB) player who played for the New York Yankees, Cleveland Indians, and Texas Rangers from 1966 to 1976. Peterson was a southpaw starting pitcher who enjoyed his best success in 1970 with the Yankees when he went 20–11 and pitched in the All-Star game. He is widely known for trading families with teammate Mike Kekich in the early 1970s. He had a career record of 133–131.

Fritz Peterson has the lowest ratio of base on balls per innings pitched for any left-handed pitcher to pitch in the major leagues since the 1920s.

Early life

Peterson attended Arlington High School in Arlington Heights, Illinois. He was the number two pitcher on his high school team, behind Gene Dahlquist, who went on to play college football at the University of Arizona and professionally for the Norfolk Neptunes in the Continental Football League. Arlington High School produced several major league baseball players, including Paul Splittorff, Dick Bokelmann, and George Vukovich. He attended college at Northern Illinois University. He was viewed as a promising hockey player and gave up playing hockey to concentrate on baseball. He was signed by the New York Yankees in 1963 as an amateur free agent by Yankee scout Lou Maguolo.

Peterson and Splittorff pitched against each other twice during their careers, with Peterson winning both matchups. On August 17, 1971, the Yankees beat the Kansas City Royals 2–0 at Yankee Stadium (in the days before the Designated Hitter, both pitchers went 0–2 at the plate), and on August 22, 1975 at the old Royals Stadium, the Indians beat the Royals, 9–5.

Professional career

Minor leagues
After signing with the Yankees, Peterson was assigned to the Rookie Appalachian League team in Harlan, Kentucky. In twelve games (ten starts), he went 4–3, with a 4.43 earned run average (ERA); he struck out 80 batters in 61 innings pitched. He also hit .273 with one Home Run. His first professional baseball manager was Gary Blaylock. He played Winter Ball in the 1964 Florida East Coast Instructional League; he had a 7–2 record with a 1.68 ERA, striking out 45 batters in 59 innings.

In 1964, he played for the Yankees Class A Western Carolinas League farm team in Shelby, North Carolina. In 21 starts, Peterson amassed a 10–7 record, with a 2.73 ERA; he struck out a team-leading 194 batters in 155 innings. He also hit .345 with four Home Runs.

Peterson was even more impressive in his third season. Assigned to the Class A Carolinas League farm team in Greensboro, North Carolina, Peterson had an 11–1 record in fourteen starts, with a 1.50 ERA, and 83 strikeouts in 108 innings. He was later moved up to the Confederate Yankees in the Class AA Southern League in Columbus, Georgia. He went 5–5 with a 2.18 ERA in twelve starts with 62 Strikeouts in 91 innings. His teammates in Columbus included future Yankees Stan Bahnsen, Mike Hegan, Mike Ferraro, and Roy White.

Yankees minor league pitching coach Cloyd Boyer is credited with helping Peterson become a star pitcher.

Major leagues

MLB rookie season
Peterson was invited to spring training with the Yankees in 1966. Yankees manager Johnny Keane was high on Peterson, telling reporters that he averaged three strikeouts for every walk in the minors. At age 24, he became the number two starter on the Yankees pitching staff.

He made his major league debut on Friday, April 15, 1966 against the Baltimore Orioles. Before a crowd of 35,624 at Memorial Stadium in Baltimore, Peterson pitched a complete game, striking out three batters and walking none. The Yankees won 3–2, giving Peterson his first major league victory. Future Hall of Famer Frank Robinson hit a solo home run off of Peterson in the ninth inning, but he got Brooks Robinson to fly out to left and Boog Powell grounded out to first to give the Yankees the win. The losing pitcher was Wally Bunker. His first major league strikeouts were Paul Blair, Andy Etchebarren, and Bunker.

"Where the vintage pitchers like Whitey Ford, Pedro Ramos and Bob Friend had failed, Frederick (Fritz) Peterson succeeded yesterday for the New York Yankees. In his first major league game, the 24-year-old left-hander beat the Baltimore Orioles, 3–2, and drew an accolade from his manager, Johnny Keane," the New York Times wrote of his debut. Keane said: "Not many young pitchers have his control. That's his strength, that and his fastball."

The Yankees starting lineup for Peterson's first game was: Bobby Richardson at 2B, Roy White in CF, Roger Maris in RF, Tom Tresh in LF, Joe Pepitone at 1B, Clete Boyer at 3B, Elston Howard at C, and Bobby Murcer at SS.

In his rookie season, Peterson went 12–11 in 32 starts for the Yankees. He had a 3.31 ERA with 96 strikeouts in 215 innings. He tied Mel Stottlemyre (12–20) as the team leader in wins. The Yankees finished last in the American League that season with a 70–89 (.440) record. Keane was replaced during the season with a new manager, Ralph Houk.

Peterson wore #52 on his uniform during his rookie season, and switched to #19 in 1967 after Bob Friend was traded to the New York Mets.

Yankees starting pitcher
Peterson went 8–14 in 1967 (3.47 ERA, 102 strikeouts), 12–11 in 1968 (2.63 ERA, 115 strikeouts), and 17–16 in 1969 (2.55 ERA, 150 strikeouts). He had the best season of his career in 1970, with a 20–11 record (2.90 ERA, 127 strikeouts). He went 15–13 in 1971 (3.05 ERA, 130 strikeouts), 17–15 in 1972 (3.24 ERA, 100 strikeouts), and 8–15 in 1973 (3.95 ERA, 59 strikeouts). In 1969 and 1970, Peterson had the best strikeout-to-walk ratios in the AL. Peterson also led the league in fewest walks per 9 innings pitched 5 years in a row, 1968–1972. The last pitcher who did that 5 years in a row was Cy Young. In 1970 and 1975, he had the 10th-best win–loss percentages in the league.

During the final game at Yankee Stadium on Sunday, September 21, 2008, ESPN Sports announced that Fritz Peterson had the all-time lowest earned run average at Yankee Stadium, with a 2.52 ERA. Whitey Ford was second with a 2.55 ERA. The honor is permanent since Yankee Stadium has been demolished. Peterson was the starting pitcher for the Yankees in the last game played at the original Yankee Stadium, which was completely renovated after the final game of the 1973 season.

In his nine years as a Yankees pitcher, Peterson had a 109–106 record, with a 3.10 ERA and 893 strikeouts. Between 1969 and 1972, Peterson was one of the most successful left handed pitchers in baseball; only Mike Cuellar, Mickey Lolich and Dave McNally won more games in the American League than Peterson did during those four years. He is ninth on the Yankees All-Time Games Started list, and tenth on the All-Time Yankees Innings Pitched list.

Peterson never played in a post-season game with the Yankees. "Mediocre at best," Peterson said of the Yankee teams that followed the Mantle-Maris era of the mid to late 1960s. "Pathetic at worst."

American League All-Star
He was named to the 1970 AL All-Star team. The American League team was leading 4–1 in the bottom of the ninth inning when Catfish Hunter gave up a Home Run and two singles. With runners at first and second, Peterson was called in by AL Manager Earl Weaver to replace Hunter. Future Hall of Famer Willie McCovey singled tor right, driving in Bud Harrelson, with future HOF'er Joe Morgan moving to third. Fellow Yankee Stottlemyre then replaced Peterson.

Trade to Cleveland Indians
Peterson's pitching seemed to suffer in 1973 and 1974 after the swap, and he was roundly booed in nearly every American League ballpark afterwards. He was traded along with Steve Kline, Fred Beene and Tom Buskey by the Yankees to the Cleveland Indians for Chris Chambliss, Dick Tidrow and Cecil Upshaw on April 26, 1974. Peterson went 9–14 for the Indians in 1974, and 14–8 in 1975.

Peterson wore #30 during the 1974 season, and switched to #16 in 1975 and 1976.

Later career
After a 0–3 start with a 5.55 ERA in nine games, Peterson was dealt from the Indians to the Texas Rangers for Stan Perzanowski and cash on May 29, 1976. He started two games for the Rangers and had a 1–0 record when a shoulder injury ended his season. The Rangers released him on February 2, 1977. Two weeks later, he signed as a Free Agent with the Chicago White Sox. After his second shoulder surgery, Peterson announced his retirement from baseball on May 4, 1977.

Wife swap
Peterson is probably best remembered today for swapping wives and children with fellow Yankee pitcher Mike Kekich, an arrangement the pair announced at spring training in March 1973. The Peterson and Kekich families had been friends since 1969. Peterson and the former Susanne Kekich are still married, but the relationship between Kekich and Marilyn Peterson did not last very long. By June, the Yankees traded Kekich. "It's a love story. It wasn't anything dirty," Peterson told a reporter in 2013. "I could not be happier with anybody in the world. 'My girl' and I go out and party every night. We're still on the honeymoon and it has been a real blessing."

Post-baseball career
Peterson provided color commentary for the New York Raiders of the World Hockey Association during the 1972–73 season. Later, Peterson and Susanne Kekich lived outside Chicago, where he worked as a blackjack dealer at the Grand Victoria Casino in Elgin, Illinois. Peterson is also notable for his appearances in Jim Bouton's bestselling 1970 non-fiction book Ball Four, where he is generally portrayed as one of the few major leaguers and former Yankees who had a positive view of Bouton.

Fritz Peterson released his first book, Mickey Mantle Is Going to Heaven in July 2009. Eventually, Peterson says, "he plans to meet Mantle there and talk about old times." Sports author Maury Allen is quoted as saying, "Fritz's book is even better than Bouton's Ball Four."

He is the author of The Art of De-Conditioning: Eating Your Way to Heaven, where he writes about his decision to "accept his own eating habits and no longer worry about his weight affecting him on the field."

His third book, When the Yankees Were on the Fritz: Revisiting the Horace Clarke Era, looks at a low-point in Yankee history when the team could not win a pennant despite the pitching combination of Peterson and Stottlemyre.

Peterson is a cancer survivor, having battled prostate cancer twice. He is an "intensively religious" man, an "evangelical Christian who used to work with Baseball Chapel."

A known practical joker, Peterson was reportedly popular with this teammates, entertaining them with his elaborate jokes. He once used fake Baseball Hall of Fame letterhead to ask Moose Skowron to donate his pacemaker after he died, and used fake Yankees letterhead to ask Clete Boyer to participate in an "official drinking contest" against Don Larsen and Graig Nettles.

Peterson is a regular attendee at the Yankees Fantasy Camp in Florida, and the Yankees Old-Timers' Day game at Yankee Stadium.

On July 23, 2018, Peterson announced on his Facebook page that he was diagnosed "with Alzheimer's several months ago after falling apart very quickly."

Movie project
As of 2015, Ben Affleck and Matt Damon were developing a movie based on Peterson and Kekich, and owned the rights to The Trade, based on a book by Allen. Jay Roach was attached as director. Peterson was a consultant to Warner Bros.

References

External links

Fritz Peterson at Baseball Almanac
Fritz Peterson at Baseball Reference
Details of the Peterson-Kekich trade
"Kekich and Peterson made strangest trade in '73," 3/7/05
Fritz Peterson on Pitching
Fritz Peterson Toasts Mel Stottlemyre
Baseball Cards

1942 births
Baseball players from Illinois
Cleveland Indians players
Columbus Confederate Yankees players
Northern Illinois Huskies baseball players
Greensboro Yankees players
Harlan Yankees players
Living people
Major League Baseball pitchers
New York Yankees players
Texas Rangers players
American League All-Stars
World Hockey Association broadcasters